Reza Dehdar  (born 2 July 1995 in Ramhormoz) is an Iranian weightlifter. He won the silver medal in the men's 102kg event at the 2022 World Weightlifting Championships held in Bogotá, Colombia. He won a bronze medal at the 2019 World Weightlifting Championships.

Major results

References

External links

 
 

1995 births
Living people
Iranian male weightlifters
World Weightlifting Championships medalists
Sportspeople from Khuzestan province
21st-century Iranian people